Where's Mommy Now? is a book written by Rochelle Majer Krich and published by Pinnacle Books (now owned by Kensington Books) on 1 June 1990 which later went on to win the Anthony Award for Best Paperback Original in 1991.

References 

Anthony Award-winning works
American mystery novels
1990 American novels
Pinnacle Books books
1990 debut novels